Thysanostigma is a genus of flowering plants belonging to the family Acanthaceae.

Its native range is Thailand to Malaysian Peninsula.

Species:
 Thysanostigma odontites (Ridl.) B.Hansen 
 Thysanostigma siamense J.B.Imlay

References

Acanthaceae
Acanthaceae genera